Rachel Kramer (born in Rotterdam on 9 August 1980) is a Dutch singer and the runner-up of the second season of the X Factor in the Netherlands.  Her first single was a cover of Rascal Flatts's  "What Hurts the Most". Until 2003, Kramer was a member of the Dutch band K-otic.

References

External links
 

1980 births
Living people
Musicians from Rotterdam
21st-century Dutch singers
21st-century Dutch women singers